"Awful, Beautiful Life" is a song co-written and recorded by American country music artist Darryl Worley.  It was co-written with Harley Allen. It was released in June 2004 as the lead single from Worley's self-titled album.  The song became his third and (to date) most recent No. 1 hit on the Billboard Hot Country Singles & Tracks chart in January 2005, holding the position for two weeks.

Content
"Awful, Beautiful Life" is an up-tempo featuring accompaniment from electric guitar.

The story, told in first person, describes the events of a Sunday in a young family man's life. The main protagonist reluctantly goes to church with his wife, despite having been out with his friends the night before. Later, the family attends a cookout and spends time with other family members. Later, everyone prays for a cousin who has been deployed to Iraq, well aware he may never return home alive. That night, as the protagonist lays in bed, he reflects on his day, thankful for his blessings and summing this all up by stating how he "love[s] this crazy, tragic, sometimes almost magic, awful, beautiful life."

Critical reception
People magazine noted that "the country singer exhibits an insightful awareness of life's vagaries" on the song, and designated it as the album's recommended download.

Music video
Directed by Cameron Casey, this video plays out the events related in the song's lyrics; Worley's participation in the events is interspersed with performance shots of him singing while standing in a field, standing by a fence and in front of a barn, and driving an old red chevy convertible. Near the end of the video, Worley is shown picking up his cousin and drops him off at his house.

Chart performance
"Awful, Beautiful Life" debuted at No. 56 on the Hot Country Singles & Tracks chart the week of July 10, 2004. After a long climb up the chart, the song reached No. 1 the week of January 22, 2005. The song also peaked at No. 30 on the Billboard Hot 100 in early 2005.

Year-end charts

References

2004 singles
Darryl Worley songs
Songs written by Harley Allen
Songs written by Darryl Worley
Song recordings produced by Frank Rogers (record producer)
DreamWorks Records singles
2004 songs